John Dempster (born 1 April 1983) is a professional football manager and former player who manages the Coventry City under-18s. Born in England, he made one appearance for the Scotland U21 national team.

Club career

Rushden & Diamonds
Born in Kettering, Northamptonshire, Dempster began his career playing in the Football League for Rushden & Diamonds.

Oxford United
In 2006 Dempster signed for Oxford United during the January transfer window.

Kettering Town
From 2007 he has been playing for Kettering Town, where he captained the side to promotion to the Conference Premier, and was awarded Players' Player and Supporters' player.

Crawley Town
Following a string of impressive performances for Kettering Town, Dempster was signed by Crawley Town for an undisclosed fee in the 2011 transfer window, in the middle of their promotion-winning season that saw Crawley elevated to the Football League.

Mansfield Town
In May 2012, Dempster was released by Crawley after being deemed surplus to requirements following a handful of League 2 appearances that year and a loan spell at Conference Premier club Mansfield Town. He signed for Mansfield permanently for the 2012/13 season. After an injury and a spell on loan at Tamworth, Dempster established himself as a regular in the side that went on to win the Conference Premier on the last day of the season. Dempster signed a new contract at The Stags for 2013/14, making a return to the Football League. He captained the team in the absence of Adam Murray.

International career
Dempster is a former Scotland under-21 international, and has also represented Scotland at under-20 level. He is eligible to play for Scotland because his father is from Ayrshire.

He was also selected for Paul Fairclough's England National XI side back in 2006.

Coaching and managerial career
Dempster accepted the position of academy manager at Mansfield at the end of the 2014–15 season. On the resignation of club manager Steve Evans in February 2018, Dempster assumed the role of caretaker manager, until new manager David Flitcroft was confirmed 1 March 2018.

Dempster was promoted to the position of Mansfield Town manager when Flitcroft's contract was terminated 14 May 2019. He was sacked on 14 December 2019 following a poor run of form.

On 7 February 2020, Dempster was appointed as Coventry City's Lead Professional Development Phase Coach, which saw him take charge of the club's under-18 team.

Managerial statistics

Honours
Rushden & Diamonds
Football League Third Division: 2002–03

Kettering Town
Conference North: 2007–08

Crawley Town
Conference Premier: 2010–11

Mansfield Town
Conference Premier: 2012–13

References

External links

1983 births
Living people
Sportspeople from Kettering
English footballers
Scottish footballers
Scotland under-21 international footballers
Association football defenders
Rushden & Diamonds F.C. players
Oxford United F.C. players
Kettering Town F.C. players
Crawley Town F.C. players
Mansfield Town F.C. players
Tamworth F.C. players
English Football League players
National League (English football) players
English football managers
Scottish football managers
Mansfield Town F.C. managers
English Football League managers
English people of Scottish descent
Coventry City F.C. non-playing staff
Association football coaches